Cristine Spataru (born 4 February 1986) is a Romanian female triple jumper, who won an individual gold medal at the Youth World Championships.

References

External links

1986 births
Living people
Romanian female triple jumpers